Dan Falzon (born 24 November 1972) is an Australian actor of Maltese descent, best known for his role as Rick Alessi on the television soap opera Neighbours.  He also appeared in the Channel Nine drama The Alice, as a park ranger. He also formed the short-lived pop group Milk with his brother, releasing the single "Seventeen" in 1997. Currently he is employed by St John Ambulance (NT) Inc. as a paramedic in Alice Springs, along with his two brothers, Tom and Ben, who also run an eco-tourism business together, Milikom.

He is involved in Project Bluestar 2000–12, a communications, research and development project established to build awareness on climate change and Extra Dimensional activity on the planet Earth. He uses the YouTube username federationphantom to broadcast a personal diary from Earth Sanctuary.

References

External links

Photographs of Falzon as "Rick"

1972 births
Living people
Australian people of Maltese descent
Australian male television actors